Datuk Seri Abu Zahar bin Ithnin (died 12 July 2013) was a Malaysian politician and the Chief Minister of Malacca from May 1997 to December 1999. He had also been Malacca State Legislative Assembly Speaker. His daughter, Dira Abu Zahar is also a politician and former actress.

Death
Ithnin died of complications of a kidney disease on 12 July 2013 at the age of 74. He was buried at the Malacca Heroes Mausoleum near Al Azim Mosque, Malacca Town.

References

Year of birth missing
2013 deaths
People from Malacca
Malaysian Muslims
Malaysian people of Malay descent
United Malays National Organisation politicians
Chief Ministers of Malacca
Members of the Dewan Rakyat
Members of the Malacca State Legislative Assembly
Malacca state executive councillors
Speakers of the Malacca State Legislative Assembly